The , also known simply as , is a bullet hell shoot 'em up video game series created by one-man independent Japanese doujin soft developer Team Shanghai Alice. Since 1995, the team's member, Jun'ya "ZUN" Ōta, has independently developed programming, graphics, writing, and music for the series, self-publishing 18 mainline games and six spin-offs . ZUN has also produced related print works and music albums, and collaborated with developer Twilight Frontier on seven official Touhou spin-offs, most being fighting games.

The Touhou Project is set in  a land sealed from the outside world and primarily inhabited by humans and yōkai, legendary creatures from Japanese folklore that are personified in Touhou as bishōjo in an anthropomorphic moe style. Reimu Hakurei, the miko of the Hakurei Shrine and the main character of the series, is often tasked with resolving supernatural "incidents" caused in and around Gensokyo.

The first five games were developed for the Japanese NEC PC-9800 computer series, with the first, Highly Responsive to Prayers, released in August 1997; the series' signature danmaku (弾幕,  'bullet curtain') mechanics were introduced in the second game, Story of Eastern Wonderland (also 1997). The release of Embodiment of Scarlet Devil in August 2002 marked a shift to Microsoft Windows. Numerous sequels followed, including several spin-offs departing from the traditional bullet hell format.

Touhou Project has become particularly notable as a prominent source of Japanese dōjin content, with the series spawning a vast body of fan-made works such as artwork, music, print works, video games, and Internet memes. Because of this, it has gained somewhat of a cult following outside of Japan. The popularity of the series and its derivative works has been attributed in part to the few restrictions placed by ZUN on the use of his content. Unofficial works are frequently sold at fan conventions, including Comiket, where the franchise has frequently held the record for circle participation, and the official convention Reitaisai, where trial versions of the official games are typically distributed prior to release.

Games

PC-98 games
Jun'ya Ōta, who was then a mathematics student at Tokyo Denki University working under the name "ZUN Soft", developed the first five Touhou games for NEC PC-9800 personal computers, utilizing the platform's 16-bit color graphics and 6-channel FM synthesis audio. The games were published by Amusement Makers, a student game development club that Ōta was a member of.

The 1st game in the series, was released on August 15, 1997, at Comiket 52. ZUN began development in 1995 and first showcased the game in November 1996 at the 20th Hatoyama Matsuri, the annual fair held at the Hatoyama campus of Tokyo Denki University. It features the first appearance of series protagonist Reimu Hakurei, the miko of Hakurei Shrine (博麗神社 Hakurei Jinja). After the destruction of the shrine, she charges through a gateway to another world, intent on locating and punishing those responsible. It features gameplay similar to Arkanoid and differs from the vertically-scrolling format of later games. Players direct a Yin-Yang Orb (陰陽玉 Onmyō-gyoku) by side-kicking, swinging Reimu's purification rod (御幣 gohei), and firing amulets (御札 ofuda), with the goal of using it to overturn all the cards in a level. If the player runs out of time, bullets rain down from the top of the screen until the player either completes the level or dies. There are 20 stages, with every fifth stage being a battle where the player must use the orb to deal damage to a boss. After completing Stage 5, the player is given a choice between two routes, Makai (魔界,  "Demon World") and Hell (地獄 jigoku), with each featuring distinct stages, bosses, and endings. It introduces the last-resort "Bomb" system, present in some form in all subsequent games, as well as the four levels of difficulty that would become hallmarks of the series: Easy, Normal, Hard, and Lunatic. According to ZUN, 30 copies of the game were sold.

The 2nd game in the series was released alongside Highly Responsive to Prayers at Comiket 52. Reimu Hakurei returns from a training session in the mountains only to find the Hakurei Shrine overrun by ghosts and yōkai. Excited at the opportunity to test her abilities, she takes off with her Yin-Yang Orbs on the back of her turtle Genjii to seek out the source of the invasion. It is the first vertically-scrolling danmaku (弾幕 "barrage",  "bullet curtain") game and also marks the first appearance of Marisa Kirisame, the second major playable character in the series, who appears as the Stage 4 boss. ZUN has cited shoot 'em up arcade game Darius Gaiden as an influence for the gameplay, which consists of firing bullets at bosses that appear from the top of the screen while simultaneously dodging their attacks.  It is the only game in the series with five stages (excluding the extra stage). The game introduces many features that would later become standard, including weapon selection, hitboxes that are smaller than the player character, power-ups, mid-bosses, and an unlockable Extra Stage. Fifty copies of the game were sold.

 The 3rd game in the series was released on December 29, 1997, at Comiket 53. While enjoying a quiet morning walk, Reimu Hakurei stumbles across mysterious ruins that have suddenly appeared a short distance from the Hakurei Shrine's gateway. She joins in a violent competition with several others who want to explore them, as it is said that the one who reaches the heart of the ruins first will win a prize. In Match Play Mode, it is a versus-type scrolling shooter similar to Twinkle Star Sprites, in which two players engage in danmaku battles in split-screen. In Story Mode, the player faces off against nine increasingly skilled AI opponents. The combat makes use of a "Spell Gauge", with characters unleashing attacks of varying strength based on their charged level of magical power. Approximately 100 to 150 copies of the game were sold.

The 4th game in the series was released on August 14, 1998, at Comiket 54. The peace in Gensokyo (first used in this game's title) is broken when a tremendous energy surges from beneath a mountain lake, causing yōkai to swarm the Hakurei Shrine. Reimu Hakurei and Marisa Kirisame travel to seek out and eliminate the source of the disturbance, battling yōkai along the way. It features six stages, with the game ending after Stage 5 if the player selects Easy difficulty or uses a "continue". A notable new feature is a "graze" counter for near-misses. According to ZUN, 200 to 300 copies of the game were sold.

The 5th and final Touhou game for the PC-98 was released on December 30, 1998, at Comiket 55. When demons begin emerging from a cave high in the mountains of Gensokyo, Reimu Hakurei and others must travel to the depths of Makai to confront the one behind the incident. Mima and Yuuka, the final bosses of Story of Eastern Wonderland and Lotus Land Story respectively, return as playable characters along with Marisa Kirisame. The game contains six stages and includes a "Dream Gauge" system, which rewards the player for collecting items by clearing all enemy bullets when it is filled to maximum.

Windows games
After the release of Mystic Square, ZUN graduated from university and the series became inactive for four years. During this time, he worked at Taito as a game developer and also composed music for various games created by members of Amusement Makers. He left the group in 2001 to focus on game development for Microsoft Windows, forming the one-man dōjin circle Team Shanghai Alice and self-publishing all subsequent games. According to ZUN, the Windows games represent a "clean slate" for the series canon, albeit with many carry-overs and references from the PC-98 era. Games numbered with decimals are spin-offs from the main series that vary in genre.

The 6th game in the series and the first on Windows was released on August 11, 2002, at Comiket 62. It marked a dramatic graphical improvement from the PC-98 games, and the game's music and sounds used synthesized PCM and MIDI instead of FM synthesis. It introduces the "Spell Card" system, in which bosses fire danmaku patterns in a specific sequence as their health is depleted, with a health bar and unique name for each attack appearing on screen as it is used. For comparison, in the PC-98 games, boss characters would have a select few danmaku patterns that they would switch between at random.
A peaceful summer in Gensokyo is interrupted when an ominous scarlet mist blocks out the sun. As either the shrine maiden Reimu Hakurei or the magician Marisa Kirisame, the player must infiltrate the Scarlet Devil Mansion (紅魔館 Koumakan) and confront the mysterious Scarlet Devil that lives within. The game features the debut of Sakuya Izayoi, who would become a playable character in several sequels.
Several features from the PC-98 era were re-introduced in Embodiment of the Scarlet Devil, which set a standard for the later Windows installments. At the start of a game, the player must choose an attack style, which affects their character's weapon type and Spell Card bomb. A limited number of these "bombs" are provided as a method of escaping from difficult situations by dealing heavy damage to enemies, cancelling enemy bullets, and collecting all items on the screen. A notable feature added in this game and present in future main entries is Focused Fire mode, which allows the player to slow their movement and focus their shots when activated. The game features six increasingly difficult stages, with the boss of each stage being preceded by a less powerful "midboss". Playing on Easy difficulty causes the game to prematurely end after Stage 5, and completing the game after using a "continue" results in a bad ending. Once a good ending has been achieved on Normal or higher difficulty, the player unlocks a bonus "Extra Stage", which features the game's final boss battle.

The 7th game in the series, released on August 17, 2003, at Comiket 64. As the month turns to May, it is clear that winter in Gensokyo has lasted far longer than normal. As Reimu, Marisa, or Sakuya, the player must embark on a trip to the Netherworld (冥界 Meikai,  "Realm of the Dead") to find those responsible for stopping the coming of spring. With the addition of Sakuya, Perfect Cherry Blossom continues the series tradition of former bosses reappearing as playable characters. It also features a "Cherry Gauge", which is filled by grazing, shooting enemies, and completing Spell Cards without using bombs, which when full, activates a "Supernatural Border", giving the player a temporary shield. Alice Margatroid from Mystic Square makes her Windows debut in this game. As well as featuring an extra stage, the game also has an unlockable phantasm stage that can be accessed after the player clears the extra stage and has captured a certain amount of spell cards.

The 7.5th game in the series and the first versus fighting game released on December 30, 2004, at Comiket 67. It is a 2D fighting game with danmaku influences, as reflected by its heavy emphasis on Spell Card projectile attacks. As with all the official fighting games, it was primarily developed by Twilight Frontier, with ZUN providing scenarios, Spell Card designs, and several music tracks. Between the events of Perfect Cherry Blossom and Imperishable Night, a strange mist descends on Gensokyo as Reimu Hakurei and other residents find themselves inexplicably holding a feast every three days. Initial playable characters include Reimu, Marisa, Sakuya, Alice, Youmu Konpaku from Perfect Cherry Blossom, and Patchouli Knowledge from Embodiment of Scarlet Devil. Additionally playable characters become unlocked as the player completes the initial scenarios. A local multiplayer mode is included, with an unofficial patch enabling netplay.

{{Nihongo|Imperishable Night'|東方永夜抄|Tōhō Eiyashō| "Eternal Night Vignette"}}
The 8th game in the series released on August 15, 2004, at Comiket 66. It is the eve of Gensokyo's yearly Harvest Moon Festival (月見 Tsukimi) when it is discovered that the moon has been replaced with a fake. Two-person teams of humans and yōkai set out into the Bamboo Forest of the Lost (迷いの竹林 Mayoi no Chikurin) to confront the culprits and restore the moon before the night is over. The four playable teams are the Illusionary Barrier Team (Reimu Hakurei and Yukari Yakumo), the Aria of Forbidden Magic Team (Marisa Kirisame and Alice Margatroid), the Visionary Scarlet Devil Team (Sakuya Izayoi and Remilia Scarlet), and the Netherworld Dwellers' Team (Youmu Konpaku and Yuyuko Saigyouji), with the player swapping between characters on a team by activating Focused Fire mode. It adds powerful "Last Word" Spell Cards for players and enemies, as well as "Time Orb" items that affect the story by changing the speed at which the night passes.

The 9th game in the series released on August 15, 2005, at Comiket 68. The game is a split-screen versus-type shooter similar to Phantasmagoria of Dim. Dream. Spring has arrived and Gensokyo's flowers are blooming out of control, with even out-of-season varieties in full bloom. The player must battle their way through nine stages to reach Muenzuka (無縁塚,  "(Burial) Mound of the Nameless") and reveal the truth behind the abnormal spring. Initial playable characters include Reimu, Marisa, Sakuya, Youmu, and Reisen Udongein Inaba from Imperishable Night, with a total of 16 playable characters after all of them are unlocked. An official patch enabling multiplayer netplay has been released.

The 9.5th game in the series released on December 30, 2005, at Comiket 69. The game was originally created as a minigame to be included with the official fanbook Bohemian Archive in Japanese Red, but was later developed into a full game. Playing as tengu reporter Aya Shameimaru, the player is tasked with photographing bosses and their danmaku in 10 increasingly difficult stages. The game is unique in that the player has no standard shot or bombs; rather, the camera is the main method of offense and defense, as it clears bullets from the screen when used. Scoring is based on the contents of each photo, including the amount and type of bullets included. The game features bosses from Embodiment of Scarlet Devil to Phantasmagoria of Flower View.

The 10th game in the series released on August 17, 2007, at Comiket 72. This entry marks a "soft reboot" for the series, with a total overhaul of the game engine that resulted in substantial design and pacing changes. The bomb counter has been removed and replaced by the "Options" system, which adds up to four "satellites" that hover near the player and fire bullets. They can be obtained by collecting power items, and have additional effects based on selected weapon type. The "Faith" system is also used, where players can collect green "Faith" items to increase the value of point items. The game is also one of the three games in the series that allows the player to have unlimited continues, but using one results in the player having to restart the current stage.

One autumn, Reimu receives a message demanding the closure of Hakurei Shrine and threatening its destruction at the hands of the god of Yōkai Mountain. As either Reimu or Marisa, the player must ascend the mountain in order to confront the ones behind the threat and prevent the shrine from being taken over.

The 10.5th game in the series and the second versus fighting game released on May 25, 2008, at Reitaisai 5. It is a sequel to the first fighting game in the series, Immaterial and Missing Power. The story revolves around strange weather phenomenon occurring around Gensokyo, following Reimu and the other protagonists in their search for the culprit. It features a 20 Spell Card deck system, flying mechanics, and changing weather conditions that affects gameplay. Both local and online multiplayer modes are included in addition to the singleplayer Story Mode.

The 11th game in the series, released on August 16, 2008, at Comiket 74. A geyser suddenly appears one day near the Hakurei Shrine, spouting evil earth spirits from underground. Playing as Reimu or Marisa, the player must travel to the Underworld (地底 Chitei,  "underground") to find its source, assisted by one of the three yōkai allies communicating from above (Yukari Yakumo, Suika Ibuki, or Aya Shameimaru for Reimu and Alice Margatroid, Patchouli Knowledge, or Nitori Kawashiro for Marisa). The game features graze-based scoring and a variation of the "Options" system introduced in Mountain of Faith.

The 12th game in the series released on August 15, 2009 at Comiket 76. Spring has come to Gensokyo and a strange flying ship said to bring good omens has appeared in the sky. The player assumes the role of either Reimu, Marisa, or Sanae Kochiya from Mountain of Faith, as the three girls race to board the vessel. "Undefined Fantastic Objects", or UFOs will sometimes appear around the screen, and can be collected for bonus points, lives, or bombs.

The 12.3rd game in the series and the third versus fighting game released on August 15, 2009 at Comiket 76. It retains much of the gameplay of Scarlet Weather Rhapsody while adding new playable characters, Spell Cards, and weather conditions. The Story Mode, at first has only one playable character, Sanae Kochiya, but after completion, Cirno, and Hong Meiling can be unlocked. The story revolves around a giant creature that has piqued the interest of Gensokyo's residents. The three girls, each with their own ideas as to its nature, set out to investigate the mystery of the giant. Each of the nine playable characters now has an associated Spell Card, which is usable by any character once it is unlocked. Both local and online multiplayer modes are included in addition to the singleplayer Story Mode.

The 12.5th game in the series released on March 14, 2010, at Reitaisai 7. It is a sequel to Shoot the Bullet, following Aya Shameimaru on her mission to photograph the yokai of Gensokyo and their danmaku. It retains much of the same gameplay from its predecessor and features bosses from Mountain of Faith to Undefined Fantastic Object. Aya's colleague and fellow tengu reporter Hatate Himekaidou is an unlockable character. The game was released on Steam on August 2, 2019.

The 12.8th game in the series, released on August 14, 2010, at Comiket 78. It is a danmaku shooter based on the official Touhou Sangetsusei manga series. After the Three Fairies of Light destroy Cirno's house one winter, the ice fairy makes plans to take her revenge in the spring. The game features three stages and one playable character, Cirno, who has the unique ability to freeze bullets mid-air. It was released on Steam on August 2, 2019.

The 13th game in the series, released on August 13, 2011, at Comiket 80. After the events of Undefined Fantastic Object, Reimu and Marisa notice an increase in spirits in Gensokyo and take off to investigate. Also playable is Sanae, who seeks to utilize the power of the divine spirits for the Moriya Shrine gods, and Youmu, who wants to exterminate spirits that she views as unnecessary. The gameplay includes "Divine Spirits", which are dropped by defeated enemies and come in four varieties (blue, gray, purple, and green). Collecting spirits fills the player's "Trance Gauge", which can be used to enter an invincible "Trance" once filled. It was released on Steam on June 19, 2019.

The 13.5th game in the series and the fourth versus fighting game released on May 26, 2013, at Reitaisai 10. The Human Village has fallen into despair in the wake of the high number of incidents, prompting adherents of Gensokyo's three competing religions (Shinto, Taoism, and Buddhism) to battle each other to expand their faith's influence. This concept is reflected in the "Popularity" system: damage dealt and received is measured on a meter, which unlocks a special "Last Word" combo when it is filled to its maximum. The game features a completely new engine from the one used in the previous three fighting games. Both local and online multiplayer modes are included in addition to the singleplayer Story Mode.

The 14th game in the series released on August 12, 2013, at Comiket 84. Reimu, Marisa, and Sakuya are playable characters, with gameplay resembling that of Ten Desires. As clouds begin to gather and yōkai rebel all over Gensokyo, the weapons of the three main characters begin to behave bizarrely. On August 10, 2014, the game was confirmed for release on Playism, making Double Dealing Character the first game in the series to be sold for digital download. On May 7, 2015, Playism made the game available for download in Western territories, marking the official Western debut of the series. It was released on Steam on June 19, 2019.

The 14.3rd game in the series released on May 11, 2014, at Reitaisai 11. The player controls the stage 5 boss of Double Dealing Character, amanojaku Seija Kijin, who uses nine "cheat" items to clear otherwise impossible-to-beat Spell Cards. A bounty is set on Seija, and several characters from previous installments attempt to capture her over ten days. The game was released on Steam on April 1, 2019.

The 14.5th game in the series and the fifth versus fighting game, released on May 10, 2015, at Reitaisai 12. It features a similar style and gameplay to the series' previous fighting game, Hopeless Masquerade, and adds a new "Occult Ball" system for controlling special moves and battle effects. The story centers on the strange rumors circulating in Gensokyo's Human Village, which have begun to manifest themselves in the form of supernatural anomalies. It was released for PlayStation 4 on December 8, 2016, with several added features (including Reisen Udongein Inaba from Imperishable Night as a playable character), becoming the first game in the series to be released for a console system. Both local and online multiplayer modes are included in addition to the singleplayer Story Mode.

The 15th game in the series released on August 14, 2015, at Comiket 88. The game features Reimu, Marisa, Sanae, and Reisen as playable characters. Someone has taken over the Lunar Capital, and Lunarians have come to "purify" Gensokyo in order to make it suitable for them to live in; the girls must work to stop the invasion and find the perpetrator behind the incident. Unlike previous games in the series, Legacy of Lunatic Kingdom features two game modes: Legacy Mode, similar to the previous games, and Pointdevice Mode, which replaces lives and continues with a series of "chapters". When the player gets hit in this mode, they restart from the beginning of the current chapter with a small penalty to their shot power. The game was released on Steam on April 1, 2019.

The 15.5th game in the series and the sixth versus fighting game,released on December 29, 2017, at Comiket 93. It is a sequel to Urban Legend in Limbo and reuses the "Occult Ball" system. An urban legend known as the "Perfect Possession" has manifested, combining pairs of Gensokyo residents in a single body and enabling them to battle as a switchable "Master" and "Slave" tag team. The game was released on Steam on January 5, 2018. Both local and online multiplayer modes are included in addition to the singleplayer Story Mode.

The 16th game in the series released on August 11, 2017, at Comiket 92. The seasons in Gensokyo are out of control, with spring meadows alongside summer skies, autumn trees, and winter blizzards. Reimu, Marisa, Aya, and Cirno set out to find the cause of this chaos. The game features a "Sub-Season" system, where the player collects seasonal items (cherry petals, green leaves, red leaves, and snowflakes) in order to gain various boosts. Collected sub-seasons can also be released as a mini-bomb in order to clear enemy projectiles. The game was released on Steam on November 16, 2017, marking the series' Steam debut.

The 16.5th game in the series released on August 10, 2018, at Comiket 94. A danmaku photography game in the style of Shoot the Bullet and Double Spoiler, it features the antagonist of Urban Legend in Limbo, Sumireko Usami, as the playable character. It includes bosses from Legacy of Lunatic Kingdom to Hidden Star in Four Seasons, as well as Reimu, Marisa, and most of the final and extra stage bosses from the previous Windows games. The game was released on Steam on September 5, 2018.

The 17th game in the series, released on August 12, 2019, at Comiket 96. When Reimu, Marisa and Youmu discover that animal spirits are planning to attack the surface world, they venture into Hell to stop them and are accompanied by one of three friendly spirits ("Wolf", "Otter", or "Eagle"). It features a similar bonus system to Undefined Fantastic Object, with "Spirit Items" (based on the three spirit types) that activate special effects when collected in groups of five. The game was released on Steam on September 9, 2019.

The 17.5th game in the series. It is a collaboration between Team Shanghai Alice and Twilight Frontier, and is described on its official website as a "horizontally-scrolling danmaku water action game". A beta version was released on October 6, 2019. The game was scheduled to be released at Reitaisai 18, but in March 2021 Twilight Frontier announced that the game had to be postponed until further notice. It was released on October 24, 2021.

The 18th game in the series, which released on May 4, 2021. The game features Reimu Hakurei, Marisa Kirisame, Sakuya Izayoi, and Sanae Kochiya as playable characters. The game features Ability Cards, which they go investigating on Youkai Mountain. The trial version was released on March 21, 2021, at Reitaisai 18. The demo was later released on Steam on March 24, 2021. The full game was released on May 4, 2021 at Gensou Kagura 5 and on Steam.

The 18.5th game in the series, which was released on August 14, 2022, in commemoration of the 100th Comiket event. A subsequent Steam release occurred on the same day.

Other media
Music CDs
Between 2002 and 2016, ten music CDs were released as part of "ZUN's Music Collection". They are numbered from Volume 1 to 9 by release date, with Unknown Flower, Mesmerizing Journey being numbered as 5.5 due to its small size. Each album contains arrangements of music from the games as well as new compositions: 

In the loose collection of stories, club members Renko Usami and Maribel Hearn research and discuss various topics related to Gensokyo and the paranormal; Dolls in Pseudo Paradise includes an unrelated story about the fate of eight thieves spirited away to Gensokyo.

In 2006 and 2007, ZUN released , a five-volume collection of PC-98 soundtracks that includes several unused themes. The albums respectively cover Lotus Land Story, Mystic Square, Story of Eastern Wonderland, Phantasmagoria of Dim.Dream, and Highly Responsive to Prayers. Each track in the collection was enhanced with the addition of a sixth FM synthesis channel, which was originally reserved for sound effects in the games:

Original soundtracks for the six official fighting games have also been released. Several music CDs have accompanied copies of official print works; these are listed below.

Print mediaCuriosities of Lotus Asia is a series of short stories written by ZUN and serialized in 27 chapters from January 2004 to December 2007. It was published in a series of magazines including Colorful Puregirl, Magazine Elfics, Elnavi, and finally Dengeki Moeoh. An anthology edition was released on September 30, 2010 by ASCII Media Works, with illustrations by Genji Asai. In September 2015, a continuation of the series began in the official Touhou Project magazine Strange Creators of Outer World, with 8 additional chapters being published as of October 2019. The stories are told from the perspective of Rinnosuke Morichika, one of the few male characters depicted in the series and the proprietor of Kourindou (香霖堂), an antique store in Gensokyo.Touhou Sangetsusei is a four-part manga series written by ZUN and illustrated by Nemu Matsukura and Makoto Hirasaka. It was published by Kadokawa Shoten, with the first two parts serialized in Comptiq magazine and the latter two in Comp Ace magazine. The story follows three fairies (Sunny Milk, Luna Child, and Star Sapphire) and documents their daily mischief and adventures in Gensokyo. The first entry, Eastern and Little Nature Deity, was illustrated by Nemu Matsukara, beginning in May 2005. Matsukara gave up the project for health reasons in May 2006, with Makoto Hirasaka taking over for the second entry, Strange and Bright Nature Deity, which was serialized until January 2009. The third entry, Oriental Sacred Place, ran from May 2009 to January 2012; the fourth entry, Visionary Fairies in Shrine, ran from January 2016 to September 2019. The tankōbon volumes of the manga, which each include a CD with new tracks by ZUN, were released on the following dates: Eastern and Little Nature Deity (2007-01-26), Strange and Bright Nature Deity (2008-01-26, 2009-02-18, and 2009-08-26), and Oriental Sacred Place (2010-03-20, 2011-03-26, 2012-03-26). The 12.8th video game in the series, Fairy Wars, is a spin-off of the manga series.Bohemian Archive in Japanese Red is the first official fanbook, written by ZUN and published by Ichijinsha on August 11, 2005. It consists of newspaper articles written from the perspective of Aya Shameimaru about events and locations in Gensokyo, interviews with characters, commentary on tracks from previous games and music albums, and an interview with ZUN. It also includes illustrations by various artists, a collection of eight dōjinshi, and a new official comic, Extra of the Wind, illustrated by Haniwa. Each copy includes a CD containing a demo of Phantasmagoria of Flower View, three arrangements of the game's music by ZUN, and a wallpaper of the book's cover.Seasonal Dream Vision is a semi-official fanbook, published by Comic Toranoana on October 1, 2005. It is an anthology of 12 dōjinshi by various artists and contains a short story, A Beautiful Flower Blooming Violet Every Sixty Years (六十年ぶりに紫に香る花), written by ZUN as a supplement to Phantasmagoria of Flower View. It also contains a CD with various fan-made music arrangements and one arrangement by ZUN.Perfect Memento in Strict Sense is the second official fanbook, published by Ichijinsha on December 27, 2006. It is illustrated by various artists and written by ZUN from the perspective of Gensokyo historian Hieda no Akyuu, primarily containing factual information about various yōkai, such as their "threat levels" and suggested countermeasures. A manga written by ZUN and illustrated by Aki★Eda (秋★枝) based on the book's premise, Memorizable Gensokyo (記憶する幻想郷 Kioku-suru Gensōkyō), was previously published in the December 2006 issue of Comic Rex magazine. Each copy includes a CD containing three original FM synthesis tracks by ZUN and a wallpaper of the book's cover.Touhou Bougetsushou is a loose collection of works written by ZUN continuing the story of the 8th game in the series, Imperishable Night. It consists of a manga, a novel, and a series of yonkoma strips, serialized in three separate Ichijinsha magazines. The manga, Silent Sinner in Blue, was illustrated by Aki★Eda and serialized in Comic Rex magazine between June 2007 and April 2009. It follows the attempts of residents of Gensokyo to invade the Lunar Capital by rocket. The first compilation volume, which included a CD with three FM synthesis tracks by ZUN, was released on April 9, 2008. The novel, Cage in Lunatic Runagate, was serialized in quarterly Chara-Mel magazine between June 2007 and June 2009 and published as a standalone on December 25, 2009. It was illustrated by Tokiame, and offers detailed information and character insight regarding the events of Silent Sinner in Blue. The yonkoma, was serialized in Manga 4-koma Kings Palette between June 2007 and December 2012. It was illustrated by Arata Toshihira, and serves as a light-hearted discursion from the main story featuring Reisen Udongein Inaba and Tewi Inaba, who are referenced respectively in the work's title.Grimoire of Marisa is the third official fanbook, published by Ichijinsha on July 28, 2009. It is presented in the form of a scrapbook owned by Marisa Kirisame, recording her encounters with noteworthy Spell Cards. It is written by ZUN and illustrated by Takeshi Moriki, with a cover illustration by Genji Asai. It includes a CD with music by ZUN and several wallpapers.Wild and Horned Hermit is a manga series written by ZUN and illustrated by Aya Azuma, serialized from July 2010 to June 2019 in Ichijinsha's Chara Mel Febri magazine. It introduces protagonist Kasen Ibaraki, a mysterious hermit who descends from the mountains of Gensokyo in order to dispense knowledge to its residents.Symposium of Post-mysticism is the fourth official fanbook, published by Ichijinsha on April 27, 2012. It was written by ZUN and illustrated by various artists, and presented in the form of a dialogue hosted by Marisa Kirisame and featuring Kanako Yasaka, Byakuren Hijiri, and Toyosatomimi no Miko.  It features profiles of almost every character from Mountain of Faith to Ten Desires as well as a collection of in-universe newspaper articles from the Bunbunmaru Newspaper and Kakashi Spirit News.Forbidden Scrollery is a manga series written by ZUN and illustrated by Moe Harukawa, serialized between October 2012 and July 2017 in Comp Ace magazine. The story revolves around Kosuzu Motoori, a collector of various rare and dangerous demon books in Gensokyo and an employee of the Suzunaan book lender. It was licensed for an English-language release by Yen Press and released in seven volumes between November 2017 and May 2019, making it the first Touhou Project print work to be officially translated.Strange Creators of Outer World is an official Touhou Project magazine, supervized by ZUN and published by Kadokawa under their Dengeki Moeoh imprint since September 2015. It features interviews with ZUN and other dōjin creators, a continuation of the official manga Curiosities of Lotus Asia, and comics and CDs by various artists, among other related content.Alternative Facts in Eastern Utopia is the fifth official fanbook, published by Kadokawa on March 30, 2017. It was written by ZUN and contains illustrations from various artists. It is presented as Aya Shameimaru's attempt to create a tabloid magazine in the style of those from the outside world, featuring similar content to the earlier fanbook Bohemian Archive in Japanese Red, but in a significantly more chaotic and haphazard format.The Grimoire of Usami is the sixth official fanbook, published by Kadokawa on April 27, 2019. It primarily features a manga written by ZUN and illustrated by Aya Azuma, with a cover illustration by Genji Asai. In an attempt to emulate the fireworks of the outside world, the residents of Gensokyo decide to hold a grand display of Spell Cards, which is interrupted partway through by a group of unexpected guests.Cheating Detective Satori is a manga series written by ZUN and illustrated by Ginmokusei (銀木犀). It began monthly serialization on Kadokawa's ComicWalker website on October 28, 2019.Lotus Eaters is a manga series written by ZUN and illustrated by Mizutaki (水炊き). It began serialization in Kadokawa Shoten's monthly Comp Ace magazine on November 26, 2019.

Gameplay

In the games, the player's bullet power increases on a linear scale as the player collects power-ups dropped by enemies, and eventually maxes out. The player can also collect "point" icons to earn extra lives; the amount needed grows exponentially as the player's score rises. The player can enter "focus mode" by holding the shift key by default, which slows down the player's movement, makes their hitbox visible (from Perfect Cherry Blossom onwards), and generally focuses the player's attack to make it more powerful. The graze counter, missing from Mountain of Faith and Story of Eastern Wonderland, tracks how many bullets entered the character sprite but avoided the hitbox, rewarding the player with a score bonus for taking risks.

The player can use a "bomb" or "spell card", similar to the "bomb" in many other shooting games. Although the player has a limited number at any given time, losing a life replenishes the current number of bombs up to a certain amount. With some exceptions, use of a bomb will make the user temporarily invulnerable, clear many of the bullets, and cause heavy damage to any enemies on screen. The overall effect the bomb has varies by character and by game. The player can use one during a short period after being hit by a bullet (called a "deathbomb") to avoid loss of a life. The amount of time the player has available to deathbomb is usually around 0.3 seconds (8 frames). Bosses have attack phases, which are also referred to as spell cards, but with bosses the term applies to a prolonged pattern of movements and shots that last until the player depletes the boss' health by a certain amount or the time runs out.

Each individual game of the main series from Perfect Cherry Blossom to Wily Beast and Weakest Creature has additional items that affect some aspect of gameplay, such as scoring or gaining extra lives/bombs. For example, Perfect Cherry Blossom has "cherry points", which are used mostly in scoring, but can grant temporary invulnerability (known as the "supernatural border"); Imperishable Night has "time points", which are essential for advancing to later stages, and also determine if the player gets to challenge a boss's 'final spell' on normal or higher difficulties; Mountain of Faith has "faith" points, which boost the score the player receives upon gathering point items and bonuses for clearing spell cards without dying or using a spell card.

Each main Touhou game has four difficulty levels ("easy", "normal", "hard", and "lunatic") with each one being harder than the previous. Regardless of difficulty choice, there are six stages in each game that become progressively difficult. The only exceptions to this are Story of Eastern Wonderland and Embodiment of Scarlet Devil on easy difficulty, both of which only have five stages.

In addition to the four main difficulties, there is an extra stage, unlocked after completing the game without using any continues. The extra stage is more difficult than "normal" and less difficult than "hard", and contains an especially long boss fight (usually with ten spell cards). Bosses in extra stages are usually immune to bombs. The only games that allow players to reach the extra stage by completing the easy difficulty are Story of Eastern Wonderland, Mystic Square, Perfect Cherry Blossom, Imperishable Night, Fairy Wars, Double Dealing Character, Legacy of Lunatic Kingdom, Hidden Star in Four Seasons, Wily Beast and Weakest Creature, and Unconnected Marketeers. In Perfect Cherry Blossom, there is a phantasm extra stage where the difficulty is increased even further. The phantasm stage is accessed by beating the extra stage and capturing at least 60 spells with any of the characters and weapon types combined.

 Glossary 

Plot

Background
Originally, it was simply called "a remote separated land of a human village in an eastern country." Long before Touhou Project's story begins, many non-humans like yōkai lived with some humans in the area. After a few humans disappeared into Gensokyo, many humans became afraid of approaching this area, while others settled there to exterminate yōkai. However, as time went on, humans developed civilization and multiplied in number, and thus yōkai worried about how the balance between humans and yōkai would be affected. 500 years before Embodiment of Scarlet Devil (EoSD), the yōkai sage Yukari Yakumo developed the "boundary of phantasm and substance," which was favored by the yōkai and protected the balance. This was called the "Yōkai Expansion Project" and made Gensokyo a phantasmal world that automatically called out to the weakened yōkai of the outside world. Other things that disappear from the outside world, like extinct animals, lost tools, and architecture, appear in Gensokyo. Since Gensokyo was a plot of land in Japan that is separated by a barrier, it is Japan that is immediately outside of this barrier.

As a result of the seal, Gensokyo became inaccessible from the outside world, and similarly, those in Gensokyo were unable to leave. Gensokyo's existence could not be confirmed from the outside world, nor could the outside world be confirmed within Gensokyo. As a result, the isolated community developed its own civilization, separate from the outside world. Although separated by a barrier, it is a bordering world to its outside, as opposed to being in a parallel universe. There are no seas in Gensokyo, since it is landlocked. In Gensokyo, there are few humans, and various kinds of yōkai. Some species include magicians, beasts, therianthropes, vampires, bōrei, tengu, mermaids, kappa, and yōkai (a kind of miscellaneous group). There are others species that could be yōkai depending on definition, like fairies, spirits, yūrei, onryō, poltergeists, hermits, oni, and gods which are all portrayed in human female form.

In present Gensokyo, presented in all Touhou Project games since EoSD, magical and spiritual qualities prevail compared to the outside world where unscientific phenomena were dismissed as "superstition" around the time of the Meiji era. The only known gateway from the outside world into Gensokyo is the Hakurei Shrine on the border of Gensokyo. The spell card rules were also established to keep up the relationship between humans and yōkai in a mock style, which was necessary for the preservation of the balance of Gensokyo. The "Great Hakurei Barrier," managed by past Hakurei miko, was constructed several decades before EoSD, which is described as a "barrier of common sense," and is thus a strong logical barrier that not even yōkai can pass through. The yōkai opposed its construction at first before understanding its usefulness.

In-game events
In Gensokyo, events called "incidents" occur once in a while. An incident is an event that affects all of Gensokyo and is of unknown cause at the time it occurs. Touhou Project mainly focuses on incidents that affects the entirety of Gensokyo in its stories, but there are also works like Mountain of Faith that are centered on lesser-scale events.

Frequently, incidents are due to a yōkai whim or curiosity, and usually Reimu Hakurei would go to investigate it and find and chastise the perpetrator. While Reimu is usually the one to resolve incidents, there are cases where Marisa Kirisame and other characters would resolve them. When a major incident occurs, the spirits and fairies are affected by the incident and experience an increase in power for the duration incident.

Characters

With its focus on bishōjo characters, the Touhou series possesses a large cast compared to other shooting games. While they are not developed nearly to the standards of a story-based game, many players love them. One example is Hong Meiling, affectionately called Chūgoku (China), the stage 3 boss of Embodiment of Scarlet Devil, who won a popularity contest in Japan out of all Touhou characters. Among the vast array of characters, only six named characters are male. One (Genjii) is a turtle, one is a cat (Sokrates), two (Youki Konpaku and Myouren Hijiri) are only mentioned in passing, one (Rinnosuke Morichika) who is a merchant is only featured in the serialized novel, and the last (Unzan) is a cloud-like entity. There is also one before all these (Shingyoku), but this character has three forms of different genders, so this character may not exactly be male.

Though each game features a collection of different characters, the main protagonist of the series is always Reimu Hakurei, joined by Marisa Kirisame after the second game. Exceptions to this include Shoot the Bullet and Double Spoiler (Aya Shameimaru is playable on both, and Hatate Himekaidou can become playable in Double Spoiler), Fairy Wars (which has Cirno as the sole playable character), Impossible Spell Card and Gold Rush (where only Seija Kijin is playable), Violet Detector (where only Sumireko Usami is playable) and 100th Black Market (where only Marisa Kirisame is playable).

Development
The Touhou Project is a one-man project by Jun'ya Ōta (usually under the pseudonym ZUN), who does all the graphics, music, and programming alone for the bullet hell games, with the exceptions of the portrait art in Fairy Wars, which was done by Makoto Hirasaka. The fighting games, Immaterial and Missing Power, Scarlet Weather Rhapsody, Touhou Hisōtensoku, Hopeless Masquerade, Urban Legend in Limbo, and Antinomy of Common Flowers, were dual efforts with Twilight Frontier, in which ZUN wrote the music and story, and Twilight Frontier created the art and gameplay.

ZUN's first interest in developing video games came during his high school years. While most shoot 'em up games utilise a military or science fiction theme, ZUN wanted a game with a miko main character, and a Shinto aesthetic. ZUN was part of his school's orchestra club, and originally wanted to create music for video games. He went to college, hoping to compose music for fighting games, since they were popular at the time due to Street Fighter II. As he did not know anybody else who was making games that he could put his music in, he made his own games for this purpose, which led to the first Touhou game, Highly Responsive to Prayers, being released in 1996. The first game was originally intended as a practice in programming. Touhou only became a shooting game series from the second game onwards, because the popularity of shooting games had revived due to RayForce and ZUN had long been a fan of such games. ZUN remarked how the general theme and direction of Touhou only started coming together in the sixth game, Embodiment of Scarlet Devil.

ZUN develops his games with Visual Studio, Adobe Photoshop, and Cubase, according to his interview in Bohemian Archive in Japanese Red.

Reception and fanworks

Many derivative works based on Touhou have been created since the release of Embodiment of Scarlet Devil, including dōjinshi, dōjin music (many of the songs had been made remixing the original games' music), dōjin anime, and dōjin games (even though the Touhou games themselves are dōjin games). The vast scope of Touhou Project derivatives prompted commentary, noting that Touhou Project became an unmissable aspect of Japanese consumer generated media. These dōjin activities are mostly responsible for adding original attributes to characters that ZUN may not have intended. ZUN, for the most part, had acknowledged, appreciated, and even encouraged these derivative works by imposing very few restrictions on the use of his works. The major restrictions are on unauthorized commercial distribution (as opposed to dōjin) and the spoiling of endings; proper attribution to Team Shanghai Alice is a requirement. ZUN stated himself that he did not want the Touhou Project game series to be officially commercialized.

The first publication of Touhou derivative doujinshi occurred during December 2003, following the release of Perfect Cherry Blossom; seven circles sold Touhou derivative works at Comiket 65 in December 2003. At Comiket 74 in August 2008, a total of 885 circles had Touhou derivative works on display or for sale, out of a total of 35,000 circles participating at Comiket. At Comiket 77 (December 2009), 2,372 circles were dedicated to Touhou, breaking the previous record held by The Prince of Tennis at Comiket 66 (August 2004), which had 2,130 circles. At Comiket 85 (December 2013), Touhou was still in the lead, with 2,272 participating circles selling Touhou derivatives, compared to Kuroko's Basketball, the second most popular franchise at that year's Comiket, which had 1,462 circles. Throughout the mid 2010s, Touhou popularity at Comiket began to diminish. From 2015-2017, Kantai Collection was consistently the most popular series at Comiket. By 2019, Touhou was the fourth most popular series at Comiket, with less than half the circles at Comiket than the Fate series.

The dōjin games based on Touhou include adaptations of other game series' mechanics with Touhou characters, such as Kōmajō Densetsu: Scarlet Symphony (a parody of the Castlevania games with the title being a play on the Japanese game of the series, Akumajō Dracula), Age of Ethanols (based on the Age of Empires series), and Touhou Puppet Dance Performance (based on the Pokémon games). 

At Tokyo Game Show 2014, ZUN announced a collaborative project with PlayStation bringing unofficial, fan-made Touhou Project dōjin games to the PlayStation 4 (PS4) and PlayStation Vita platforms. Yuyuko Saigyouji and Reimu Hakurei also made cameo character appearances in Square Enix's game Lord of Vermilion Re:2.

The music of Touhou has been a particular source of interest, and many arrangement CDs are sold at Comiket and other Japanese conventions. Among the most popular derivatives are the series of Flash music videos created by the dōjin music circle IOSYS, which are often shared on otaku internet forums and Nico Nico Douga. One such song, Marisa Stole the Precious Thing, was parodied in derivative anime music videos. Marisa Stole the Precious Thing, alongside Cirno's Perfect Math Class, Night of Nights, and Bad Apple were included in the dōjin game Touhou Spell Bubble. Toby Fox, the creator of Undertale, cited Touhou as one of his musical influences.

Several fanmade anime have been made for Touhou. Albeit created by amateur studios, the projects have sometimes included appearance by professional voice actors, such as Rie Tanaka. Dōjin anime of note include  by the circle Manpuku Jinja in 2011,  by the dōjin circle Maikaze, and Hifuu Club Activity Record ~ The Sealed Esoteric History by the Chinese dōjin circle Kyoto Fantasy Troupe.

The Touhou Project was nominated for the 11th annual Media Arts Awards held by Japan's Agency for Cultural Affairs, under the Entertainment category, where Touhou Project eventually lost to Nintendo's Wii Sports for the Grand Prize award. The series was inducted into the Guinness World Records in October 2010 as the "most prolific fan-made shooter series".

Internet memes

This meme originated from a disfigured attempt to draw the main characters Reimu and Marisa with Shift JIS art. Yukkuris became so popular that the phrase "Yukkuri shite itte ne!!!" won bronze for 2008's "Net Slang of the Year" in Japan. Yukkuris also appear in Internet advertisements, the anime Natsu no Arashi! and Pani Poni Dash!, and most notably, the front page of 2channel, one of the most visited Japanese websites.

Reitaisai
The  is the largest of the many dōjin conventions hosting only Touhou content. Although the coordinator of this convention has nothing to do with Team Shanghai Alice officially, the name "Hakurei Shrine Reitaisai" was given by ZUN himself. It first started in 2004 as a way for Team Shanghai Alice to publicly distribute the trial version for their upcoming games, Imperishable Night and Immaterial and Missing Power. In addition, the 2004 Reitaisai featured a total of 114 participating circles. Since then, many Touhou derivative works are gathered and sold there. Commencing every year in April or May, the convention has been hosted in Ōta, Tokyo, in 2004; Naka-ku, Yokohama, in 2005; Sunshine City, Tokyo, in 2006 and 2007; and the Tokyo Big Sight from 2008 onwards. In 2010 Reitaisai SP, an additional Reitaisai to be held every autumn due to increasing popularity, was started, but it was cancelled after 2011, and later brought back and rebranded as Autumn Reitaisai from 2014 onwards. The 2011 Reitaisai was originally cancelled due to safety concerns after the 2011 Tōhoku earthquake and tsunami, and the release of Ten Desires was also postponed. It was later rescheduled and held on May 8, 2011, with approximately 4,940 participating circles. In addition to events in Japan, there is another Reitaisai held in Taiwan that started in 2015. The 17th Reitaisai in 2020, which was originally going to run on March 22 before being postponed to May 17, was ultimately cancelled due to safety concerns over the COVID-19 pandemic, making it the first Reitaisai to be cancelled.

 Explanatory notes 

References

External links
 Official news portal 
 Team Shanghai Alice, the official website of the group 
 Twilight Frontier, creators of Immaterial and Missing Power, Scarlet Weather Rhapsody and Touhou Hisoutensoku 
 Touhou Wiki, a multilingual unofficial fan wiki on the Touhou Project'', includes both encyclopedia articles and dōjin creations

 
2006 manga
2007 manga
Doujin video games
Bullet hell video games by series
Shoot 'em ups by series
Indie video games
Internet memes
Japan-exclusive video games
NEC PC-9801 games
NEC PC-9801-only games
Scrolling shooters
Seinen manga
Shōnen manga
Video games about shapeshifting
Video games about size change
Video games featuring female protagonists
Video games developed in Japan
Video game franchises
Video game franchises introduced in 1997
Windows games
Yōkai in popular culture